The 1945 municipal election was held November 7, 1945 to elect a mayor and five aldermen to sit on Edmonton City Council and five trustees to sit on the public school board, while four trustees were acclaimed to the separate school board.

There were ten aldermen on city council, but five of the positions were already filled: Sidney Bowcott, Athelstan Bissett (SS), Sidney Parsons, James Ogilvie, Frederick John Mitchell were all elected to two-year terms in 1944 and were still in office.

There were seven trustees on the public school board, but two of the positions were already filled: George Cormie and Alex Gemeroy had been elected to two-year terms in 1944 and were still in office.  Izena Ross had also been elected to a two-year term in 1944, but had resigned; accordingly, James MacDonald was elected to a one-year term.

On the separate board, there were four vacancies out of seven seats, as Adrian Crowe (SS), Francis Killeen, and James O'Hara were continuing.

Voter turnout

There were 19,600 ballots cast out of 69,730 eligible voters, for a voter turnout of 28.0%.

Results

 bold or  indicates elected
 italics indicate incumbent
 "SS", where data is available, indicates representative for Edmonton's South Side, with a minimum South Side representation instituted after the city of Strathcona, south of the North Saskatchewan River, amalgamated into Edmonton on February 1, 1912.

Mayor

Aldermen

Public school trustees

Separate (Catholic) school trustees

Joseph Gallant, Thomas Malone, J O Pilon, and William Wilde (SS) were acclaimed.

References

Election History, City of Edmonton: Elections and Census Office

1945
1945 elections in Canada
1945 in Alberta